Debora Seilhamer (born October 4, 1985) is a volleyball player from Ponce, Puerto Rico. Seilhamer made her debut with the Puerto Rico women's national volleyball team at the 2007 Pan American Games in Rio de Janeiro, Brazil. She was named Best Digger at the 2007 NORCECA Championship, where her team ended up in fifth place.  Seilhamer played as a libero for the Women's National Team at the 2008 Olympic Qualification Tournament in Japan. There the team ended up in eighth and last place, having received a wild card for the event after Peru and Kenya withdrew. At the 2010 Central American and Caribbean Games, Seilhamer was named Best Digger, Best Libero and MVP of the Tournament. Puerto Rico lost to the Dominican Republic in the gold medal game.

Seilhamer was a two-time second-team AVCA All-American at the University of Southern California (USC). In 2003, she helped the Women of Troy go undefeated and win the NCAA Division I national title.

She obtained her Juris Doctor at the Pontifical Catholic University of Puerto Rico, School of Law and practices law.  She is the daughter of a Puerto Rican politician Larry Seilhamer Rodríguez.

Clubs
  Indias de Mayagüez (2010–2011)
  Lancheras de Catano (2012–present)

Awards

Individuals
 2007 NORCECA Championship "Best Digger"
 2007 Pan-American Games "Best Defender"
 2010 Central American and Caribbean Games "Most Valuable Player"
 2010 Central American and Caribbean Games "Best Digger"
 2010 Central American and Caribbean Games "Best Receiver"
 2010 Central American and Caribbean Games "Best Libero"

References

External links
 FIVB Profile

1985 births
Living people
Puerto Rican people of German descent
Puerto Rican women's volleyball players
Volleyball players at the 2007 Pan American Games
Volleyball players at the 2015 Pan American Games
Pan American Games competitors for Puerto Rico
Sportspeople from Ponce, Puerto Rico
Pontifical Catholic University of Puerto Rico alumni
Volleyball players at the 2016 Summer Olympics
Central American and Caribbean Games silver medalists for Puerto Rico
Competitors at the 2010 Central American and Caribbean Games
Liberos
Puerto Rican women lawyers
Summer Olympics competitors for Puerto Rico
Central American and Caribbean Games medalists in volleyball
USC Trojans women's volleyball players